Bernard "Toots" Shor (May 6, 1903 – January 23, 1977) was best known as the proprietor of a legendary saloon and restaurant, Toots Shor's Restaurant, in Manhattan. He ran three establishments under that name, but his first – and most renowned – was located at 51 West 51st Street. He was known as a saloonkeeper, friend, and confidant to some of New York's biggest celebrities during that era.

Early life
Shor was born in Philadelphia to Orthodox Jewish parents – his father of Austrian descent from Germany and his mother from Russia. He and his two older sisters were raised in a home above the family candy store in South Philadelphia. When Shor was 15 years old, his mother was killed by an automobile while she sat on the stoop outside their home. His father committed suicide five years later. Shor attended the Drexel Institute of Technology and the Wharton School of the University of Pennsylvania before working as a traveling shirt-and-underwear salesman.

First restaurant

Shor went to New York City in 1930 and found employment as a bouncer at the Five O'Clock Club, which served as his introduction to celebrities. He later worked at several other nightspots: The Napoleon Club, Lahiff's Tavern, the Ball & Chain, the Madison Royale, and Leon & Eddie's. He became a man about town in Manhattan after opening his own restaurant, Toots Shor's, at 51 West 51st Street. While the food there was known to be "nuttin' fancy" – standard American, sports-bar fare such as shrimp cocktail, steak, baked potato – the establishment became well known for who frequented there and the manner in which Shor interacted with them.

Shor was a raconteur and a master of the "needle," jibes or quips directed at the famous. Celebrity alone was not enough to receive first-class service in Shor's restaurant. According to David Halberstam in his book The Summer of '49, guests had to observe the unwritten "code" which prevailed in Shor's establishment. Charlie Chaplin, who was not privy to that code, was made to wait in line. When Chaplin complained, Shor told him to entertain the others who were waiting in line. One day, Hollywood boss Louis B. Mayer complained about waiting twenty minutes for a table and said, "I trust the food will be worth all that waiting." Shor replied: "It'll be better'n some of your crummy pictures I stood in line for." Once while standing outside his restaurant with Frank Sinatra and a crowd of screaming fans being held back by police, Toots pulled a dollar bill out of his pocket and said to Frank, "Here, kid, go across the street and buy me a paper." At the opera with friends during the intermission Toots declared, "I bet I'm the only bum in this joint that doesn't know how this thing ends."

In one incident, Shor outdrank comedian Jackie Gleason, famously leaving Gleason on the floor to prove the point. (At Toots' funeral, the coffin had a spray of red roses with a card which read, "Save a Table for 2," signed: Jackie Gleason.)

Shor cultivated his celebrity following by giving them unqualified admiration, loyal friendship, and a kind of happy, boozy, old-fashioned male privacy. Those whom Shor really liked were called "crum-bums". Shor reputedly said that he didn't care if he was a millionaire – so long as he could live like one.

Second restaurant

In 1959, Shor sold the lease for his 51st Street restaurant for $1.5 million to William Zeckendorf. The following year, he opened at a new location at 33 West 52nd Street and tried to emulate the decor and atmosphere of the original. The then–Chief Justice, Earl Warren, considered Toots one of his closest friends. "The Chief" showed up to be photographed with a shovel full of dirt when Toots broke ground on Toots' 52nd street "joint".

Third restaurant

In 1971, authorities padlocked the doors of the 52nd Street restaurant for nonpayment of federal, state, and local taxes totaling $269,516. He vowed to open again in three weeks, but 18 months passed before his restaurant at 5 East 54th Street opened. For a variety of reasons, however, his famous clientele never returned with their former regularity.

Personal life

Shor and his wife Marion ("Baby") lived for many years in a 12-room double apartment at 480 Park Avenue, where they raised their four children named Bari Ellen, Kerry, Rory and Tracey. Tracey, who was Toots' youngest daughter and a late arrival, was taken in and raised by his friends, comedian Bob Hope and his wife Dolores, who was her godmother at birth and eventually her legal guardian.

During his final years, they lived at the Drake Hotel. He died at age 73, ending a six-week stay in New York University Hospital.

Shor's financial affairs were usually shaky at best, thanks to a cavalier attitude toward the IRS, coupled with a generous nature; debts were frequently forgiven for friends who had fallen on hard times, and drinks and meals were comped on a regular basis. Although indigent at the time of death, Shor expressed no regrets, stating that he started out broke and figured it was OK to go out that way as well.

Bob Broderick, long time friend and Manager of Toots Shor's, was quoted in the 4/20/1968 The Record: "Having Toots Shor for a friend and Margaret for a wife is about all a man can ask for out of this life."

Shor was an occasional guest on television programs, including What's My Line?, The Tonight Show Starring Johnny Carson, and The Red Skelton Show.

In Popular Culture

In 1950, Shor was the subject of a three-part biography published in The New Yorker entitled "Toots's World", written by John Bainbridge, who later combined the series into a book. Twenty years later another biography, Toots, was written by Bob Considine. In 2006, the biographical documentary Toots, in which his granddaughter Kristi Jacobson profiled his life, premiered at the Tribeca Film Festival. It took "Best Film" at the National Baseball Hall of Fame and Museum's first annual film festival on November 12, 2006. Toots was released to theaters in the fall of 2007.

Shor was portrayed by Vlasta Vrána in Gleason, a 2002 television biopic about Jackie Gleason.

The J. Peterman Company sells the "Toots Shor Blouse"  and "Toot's Shore Dress".

References

External links
 
 
 
 Toots Documentary website

1903 births
1977 deaths
Burials at Ferncliff Cemetery
Nightlife in New York City
People from Manhattan
American restaurateurs
20th-century American Jews
Saloonkeepers
20th-century American businesspeople